Tiger Flowers Cemetery is a historic cemetery for African Americans in Lakeland, Florida. Most of its burials are in crypts. It is now city-owned and has struggled with maintenance issues and poor record keeping.

The cemetery is named for boxer Tiger Flowers. Burials include Henry Wilkins Chandler. His son-in-law Dr. David John Simpson, who took care of many of the area's Spanish Influenza patients, is also buried there.

Cemeteries in the area were segregated and Tiger Flowers Cemetery is near the Roselawn Cemetery which includes a section for Confederate soldiers. Relocation of a Confederate statue from Lakeland's Munn Park to Roselawn Cemetery's Confederate section a 1/4 mile away from the African American burial ground was considered by the city.

References

African-American cemeteries in Florida
African-American history of Florida
Cemeteries in Florida